Tetranodus rugipennis is a species of beetle in the family Cerambycidae. It was described by Chemsak in 1969.

References

Tillomorphini
Beetles described in 1969